Melanoleuca melaleuca is a species of mushroom in the family Tricholomataceae, and it is the type species of its genus Melanoleuca.  It is difficult to distinguish from other related species firstly because it is variable, secondly because the taxonomic criteria are often based on characteristics which have later been found to be variable, and thirdly because there is much disagreement between authorities as to exactly how the species should be defined.

Description

Cap: 2–8 cm, low convex, often with a low umbo, smooth, dark brown fading to greyish brown
Gills: Whitish, crowded, emarginately attached to stipe
Stipe: 2–8 cm long and up to 1 cm thick, similarly coloured to the cap but lighter, with brown fibrils
Spores: 6.5–8.5 x 5–6 µm, elliptical with amyloid warts (staining blue in Melzer's reagent); spore print white
Odor and taste: Mild
Microscopic features: May have fusiform cheilocystidia or they may be missing (see below in taxonomy section).
Habitat: Grassy places in woods, roadsides, heathland etc.

This description is taken from several references, which generally agree except on microscopic features.

Due partly to the confused taxonomic definitions, this mushroom is very difficult to identify with certainty.  Various authorities imply that around M. melaleuca there is a complex of closely related species without clear dividing lines, and that the current analysis (which varies from one author to another) requires more clarification.  Much of the taxonomic work on Melanoleuca has been done in Europe and the status of North American specimens is less certain.  However a 2012 paper by Vizzini et al. proposes updated definitions based on DNA analysis and suggests that some progress on these issues is being made.

It is a widely distributed species, known from Asia, Africa, Europe, North America, and Oceania.

Like all Melanoleuca it is saprophytic, feeding on organic litter and not being associated with particular types of tree.

A similar-looking species is M. angelesiana, but this does not have cystidia on its gills as does M. melaleuca.

Taxonomy and related species
Both the species name melaleuca and the genus name Melanoleuca come from the same Ancient Greek words for black (μέλας / melas) and white (λευκόν / leukon).  The species name was originated by the Swedish mycologist Persoon in his 1801 publication Synopsis Methodica Fungorum, as Agaricus melaleucus.  This formed the basis for the genus name Melanoleuca which was invented by Narcisse Théophile Patouillard in 1897 as a variant of Melaleuca.

The underside of the cap is whitish, and the top of the cap and the stem are often quite a dark brown, but "black and white" is not a very accurate description in practice.

The species names of common animals are often identical to their genus names (as with Rattus rattus or Bufo bufo), but this form of designation (known as a tautonym) is forbidden for plants and fungi by the International Code of Nomenclature.  Melanoleuca melaleuca narrowly circumvents this rule.

Patouillard had originally named the genus Melaleuca in 1887 and called the type species Melaleuca vulgaris, presumably to avoid a tautonym.  In 1897 Patouillard changed the name of the genus to Melanoleuca.  According to modern nomenclatural rules, the older genus name should normally take precedence, but an exception has been made by the International Botanical Congress and Melanoleuca has been declared a nomen conservandum, that is, a name which is to be considered valid irrespective of the rules of precedence.

The American mycologist William Murrill devised the name Melanoleuca melaleuca in a 1911 article in the journal Mycologia.  If that is a valid name, again following modern rules, it should take precedence over Melanoleuca vulgaris as it refers to the original species name melaleucus.  But in any case, Species Fungorum gives M. vulgaris as a synonym of M. polioleuca, rather than of M. melaleuca, and Bon implies that M. vulgaris is equivalent to only part of M. melaleuca.

In certain treatments of the genus, including Funga Nordica and Flora Agaricina Neerlandica, M. melaleuca is defined as having no cheilocystidia, but molecular analysis by Vizzini et al. makes it clear that these cystidia may sometimes appear and sometimes be missing in the same species of Melanoleuca, implying that this feature should not be used to characterize the mushroom.  Other treatments specify M. melaleuca as having fusiform cheilocystidia, but recognize a separate closely related species, Melanoleuca graminicola as having no cheilocystidia.  According to Index Fungorum the latter is a valid current name, but the former two references consider M. graminicola to be a synonym of M. melaleuca.

According to its definition (which is admitted to be in need of revision), Funga Nordica also lists Melanoleuca brachyspora, Melanoleuca brevispora, Melanoleuca robertiana and Melanoleuca stridula as synonyms of M. melaleuca.

The older treatments use various characteristics to delimit the species, for instance Moser distinguishes M. melaleuca as not having a pruinose cap, with a long stem in relation to the cap diameter, having a dark brownish cap colour, with stem not coarsely striate, and having white stem flesh.

Another species which has been confused with M. melaleuca is Melanoleuca polioleuca.  In Species Fungorum (the part of Index Fungorum which evaluates current names), apart from the valid entry of M. melaleuca, there is an invalid one designated "Melanoleuca melaleuca sensu NCL" which is said to be equivalent to the current M. polioleuca.  According to Courtecuisse, M. polioleuca is distinguished by having a dense white "pruina" (a powdery covering) on the stem and by the flesh inside the stem being dark cinnamon rather than pale.

Edibility
This species is reported to be edible in both Europe and North America, although information for the latter continent was unknown as late as 2006. The confusion described in the previous section does not imply any particular culinary danger because (as far as is known) the closely related species are also edible.

References

Edible fungi
Fungi of Asia
Fungi of Africa
Fungi of Europe
Fungi of North America
Fungi of Oceania
Tricholomataceae
Fungi described in 1801
Taxa named by Christiaan Hendrik Persoon
Fungi without expected TNC conservation status